Black family may refer to:

 The Black Family, a professional wrestling group in Lucha Libre AAA Worldwide
 The Black Family (band), a Celtic music ensemble
 The Black family (1772–1797) of Blacksburg, Virginia
 The Noble and Most Ancient House of Black, a family in the fictional universe of Harry Potter
 Black Guerrilla Family, also known as Black Family, African-American prison and street gang 
 Black Family Channel, American cable television network which featured programming aimed at African-Americans

See also 
 Black (surname)
 Black (disambiguation)
 African-American family structure